Afadjato South is one of the constituencies represented in the Parliament of Ghana. It elects one Member of Parliament (MP) by the first past the post system of election. Afadjato South is located in the Afadzato South district  of the Volta Region of Ghana. It was created in 2012 by the Electoral Commission of Ghana prior to the Ghanaian general election.

Boundaries
The constituency is located within the Afadzato South District of the Volta Region of Ghana.

Members of Parliament 

The first ever election was held in December 2012 as part of the Ghanaian elections. The National Democratic Congress candidate won the seat with an 18,245 majority. The NDC retained its seat in the 2016 Ghanaian general election.

Elections

See also
List of Ghana Parliament constituencies
Hohoe South

References

Parliamentary constituencies in the Volta Region